The  is a woodpecker endemic to the Okinawa Prefecture of Japan. It was previously placed in the monotypic genus Sapheopipo.

Other common names for this species are Noguchi's woodpecker, Okinawan woodpecker, Pryer's woodpecker and Ryukyu woodpecker. Some taxonomic authorities place this species in the monotypic genus Sapheopipo.

Description 

This is a medium-sized (31 cm), dark woodpecker. It is dark brown in color with red-tipped  feathers. It has white spots on the primaries. The head is a paler brown, with a dark red crown on the male and a blackish-brown one on the female.  The call is a sharp whit call and a variable kyu-kyu kup kup kup or kyu kyu kup.

Their breeding habitat is subtropical, evergreen broad-leaved forest that is at least 30 years old, with tall trees of more than 20 cm in diameter. Nesting is between late February and May.

This woodpecker is critically endangered. It has a single tiny, declining population which is threatened by habitat loss of mature forest due to logging, dam construction, agriculture, military and golf course developments. A major problem now is that one of their main habitats is being destroyed. The current population is estimated at less than 600.  This species is suspected to be declining at a rate of 10-19% over ten years, as a result of ongoing clearance of old-growth forests.

This woodpecker is legally protected in Japan. It occurs in Yonaha-dake Prefecture Protection Area and small protected areas on Mount Ibu and Mount Nishime and conservation organisations have purchased sites where it occurs, but it is mainly found in the Okinawa Prefecture. In 1996, Yambaru was designated as a national park.

Threats to the species
The habitat of the Okinawa woodpecker is threatened by the construction of six new American helipads located about 9.5 km Southwest of the Yanbaru forest of Takae. The lives of the birds themselves are also put at risk by the flights of V-22 Ospreys over the island.

References

External links

  BirdLife Species Factsheet
Image and Classification at Animal Diversity Web

Okinawa woodpecker
Okinawa woodpecker
Endemic fauna of the Ryukyu Islands
Endemic birds of Japan
Okinawa woodpecker
Okinawa woodpecker
Okinawa woodpecker